The 1998 Brown Bears football team was an American football team that represented Brown University during the 1998 NCAA Division I-AA football season. Brown tied for second in the Ivy League. 

In their first season under head coach Phil Estes, the Bears compiled a 7–3 record and outscored opponents 265 to 241. Sean Morey and Alex Pittz were the team captains. 

The Bears' 5–2 conference tied for second in the Ivy League standings. They outscored Ivy opponents 188 to 150. 

Brown played its home games at Brown Stadium in Providence, Rhode Island.

Schedule

References

Brown
Brown Bears football seasons
Brown Bears football